Manuel Pavia y Rodriguez de Alburquerque (August 2, 1828 – January 4, 1895) was a Spanish general, born in Cadiz, who was an important part of Spanish political life during the second half of the 19th century. He participated in the Revolution of 1868, which removed Isabella II from power, and led the coup d'état which brought down the First Spanish Republic, giving way to the Restoration and the rule of Isabella's son Alfonso XII.

Early career 
His military career began in 1841, when he entered the Royal Artillery College at Segovia. He became a lieutenant in 1846 and a captain in 1855. Pavía returned to Spain after fighting in the Hispano-Moroccan War (1859–60) and in the European expedition to Mexico in 1862; in the latter year he was proclaimed major.

In January 1866, he was a commander under the general Juan Prim. He participated in an unsuccessful mutiny against the regime of Isabella II, ruined in Madrid. Prim left the Liberal Union of Leopoldo O'Donnell and joined the new Progressive Party. At the end of that year, Pavía and Prim organised a mutiny with other generals, but this rebellion didn't succeed due to lack of popular and military support.

O'Donnell sent a detachment to detain the conspirators. Prim and Pavía escaped to Portugal, persecuted by Zavala and Echagüe. During the escape they received much support from the Spanish population.

1868 revolution to restoration 

Armed insurrection broke out in Andalusia, prepared by revolutionary juntas composed by democrats and progressives, which acted in favour of a military conspiracy. In September 1868, after proclaiming the slogan España con honra (Spain with honour), Prim disembarked in Cádiz. On 28 September he won the battle of Alcolea, and the support of Barcelona and the Mediterranean coast, which was decisive for the victory of the revolution. The queen left the country in September 30 and a provisional government was set up under General Francisco Serrano.

During this period, Pavía fought in Navarra at the beginning of the Third Carlist War. With the First Spanish Republic proclaimed, during the presidency of Francesc Pi i Margall he and General Arsenio Martínez Campos put down the cantonalist insurrection initiated on 12 July 1873 in Cartagena, which aspired to constitute a federation of the autonomic territorial organizations of the central power.

Pavía and Martínez Campos one by one took almost all the cantons between July 26 and August 8, being the president Emilio Castelar. Only the canton of Cartagena resisted, until January 13 of the following year. At the end of 1873, Pavía was again Captain general of Castilla la Nueva, with a capital in Madrid. He still held the position when the president Castelar, during the first days of 1874, asked the "Congreso de los Diputados" for a vote of confidence, which was rejected.

On 3 January Pavía (whose political posture favoured united centralism) presented himself in the Congress and ordered the evacuation the building at the moment that it was proceeding to a new presidential election ruled by a federalist. With the coup d'état over, the Fase Pretoriana of the First Republic began, led by Francisco Serrano (Duque de la Torre). This rapidly gave way to the return of the monarchy of the House of Bourbon with Alfonso XII, son of Isabella II.
 
During the Restoration, Pavía was the captain general of Catalonia from 1880 until 1881 and again captain general of "Castilla la Nueva" in 1885, under the regency of María Cristina de Habsburgo-Lorena. In 1886, carrying out these duties, he defeated the popular anti-dynastic  in Madrid.

Death 
During his last years of life, he was promoted to captain general, was president of the "Consejo Supremo de Guerra y Marina" and wrote military histories. Manuel Pavía died on January 4, 1895.

References 

Some information has been taken from a book called Historia de España Nº13-Revolución y Restauración from a collection of El Mundo newspaper.

1828 births
1895 deaths
Spanish captain generals
Spanish generals
People from Cádiz
Spanish military personnel of the Third Carlist War (Governmental faction)